The 2020 Rally Finland (also known as the Neste Rally Finland 2020) was a motor racing event for rally cars that was scheduled to be held over four days between 6 and 9 August 2020, but was cancelled due to the COVID-19 pandemic. It was set to mark the seventieth running of Rally Finland and planned to be the eighth round of the 2020 World Rally Championship, World Rally Championship-2 and World Rally Championship-3. It was also planned to run as the third round of the 2020 Junior World Rally Championship.

Ott Tänak and Martin Järveoja were the defending rally winners. The team they drove for in 2019, Toyota Gazoo Racing WRT, were the defending manufacturers' winners. Kalle Rovanperä and Jonne Halttunen were the defending winners in the World Rally Championship-2 category, but they would not defend their titles as they were promoted to the higher class. In the World Rally Championship-3 category, Nikolay Gryazin and Yaroslav Fedorov were the reigning rally winners, but they would not defend their titles either as they were promoted to WRC-2 class. Tom Kristensson and Henrik Appelskog were the reigning rally winners in the Junior World Rally Championship.

Background

Route

Itinerary
All dates and times are EEST (UTC+3).

Notes

References

External links
  
 2020 Rally Finland at ewrc-results.com
 The official website of the World Rally Championship

2020 in Finnish sport
Finland
2020
Finland